"The Sharpie of the Culebra Cut" is a 2001 Disney comics story by Don Rosa. Rosa intended it as an "in-between" story to accompany his anthology The Life and Times of Scrooge McDuck, happening chronologically between chapter 10: "The Invader of Fort Duckburg" and chapter 11: "The Empire-Builder from Calisota". The story is set in 1906.

The story was first published in the French Uncle Picsou #349; the first American publication was in Uncle Scrooge No. 332, in August 2004.

Plot
Scrooge McDuck, along with his sisters Hortense McDuck and Matilda McDuck, are mining for gold in Panama, which has just recently separated from Colombia and become independent. At the same time, the construction of the Panama Canal is underway as a joint operation between Panama and the United States, and President Theodore Roosevelt has personally come to inspect the construction of the Culebra Cut. Scrooge has legal claim to a mountain which stands in the way of the canal, so Roosevelt wants to come into agreement with him so that he can give the mountain to the United States and the construction of the canal can proceed.

Roosevelt makes a secret personal deal with Scrooge: he will help Scrooge mine gold faster, so that when his mining has been completed, he can give the mountain away to the United States. To this end, Roosevelt and Scrooge steal an excavator, with which Scrooge can mine a lot faster than with his old pickaxe. The excavator goes out of control, so Roosevelt and Scrooge end up in the lands of the Guyami Indians. Chief Parita, the leader of the Guyami, doesn't trust Scrooge, so Roosevelt makes an agreement with him instead. The Guyami chief is instantly impressed by a visit from "the Chief of the United States", and entrusts Roosevelt with the location of "Gold Hill". Roosevelt and Scrooge start mining gold with the excavator, but the mountain collapses from the strain, revealing an ancient pre-Columbian giant jaguar sculpture full of magnificent riches.

Scrooge wants to claim all this to himself, while Roosevelt wants to preserve the riches in a museum. They start a fight, but this is cut short when the sculpture becomes loose and falls off the mountain. In Roosevelt's absence, distrust has broken out between the United States and Panama, and a war is about to start. However, the sculpture arrives right into the scene and a war is avoided. To keep the treasure safe from looters, Roosevelt uses the canal excavation equipment to re-bury the jaguar statue in rubble, planning to hide its location in the Presidential archives, to be sealed for a century, and confidently predicting world peace by 2006, when it will be safe to reveal the treasure (though Scrooge remains privately skeptical).

As thanks for avoiding a war with Panama, Roosevelt agrees to give Scrooge whatever he wants. Unfortunately, Scrooge passes out from accidentally drinking chicha instead of brandy, so Hortense and Matilda choose for him instead: a teddy bear, which they saw earlier while being entertained by the First Lady and thought was cute, and see as an appropriate snub to their brother's worsening greed.

Decades after, in the present day, Scrooge rues his possession of the teddy bear as a memento of "the worst deal I ever made", but when his three grandnephews tell him that Roosevelt's teddy bear is the first of its kind in the world, Scrooge jumps at the chance at putting it in a museum and earning huge profits from entrance fees, much to Donald's dismay.

Notes
This is one of Rosa's most historically accurate stories.
Historical persons appearing as characters include Theodore and Edith Roosevelt, Chief Parita of the Guyami, Captain George R. Shanton (formerly of the Rough Riders and now of the Canal Zone Police) and engineer John Frank Stevens;
Panamanian General Esteban Huertas appears simply as "General Esteban", whom Rosa needed to present as a villain rather than a hero;
Other historical personages mentioned include Manuel Amador Guerrero, the first President of Panama, French government agent Philippe Bunau-Varilla, and boxer "Gentleman Jim" Corbett, who Roosevelt claims tutored him in fisticuffs;
The teddy bear was indeed named for Roosevelt, and the first of its kind was sent to him in response to a 1902 political cartoon lampooning his refusal to shoot an American black bear that had already been captured and tied up before he arrived.  Edith Roosevelt mentions "a candy store owner in Brooklyn" (Morris Michtom) who created a stuffed animal and sold it under the name "Teddy's bear", after receiving Roosevelt's permission to use his name.
The United States Secret Service was originally chartered to investigate counterfeiting and other financial crimes, but assumed responsibility for the President's security after William McKinley's assassination and his succession by Roosevelt, in September 1901.
The comic features two (slightly edited) quotations from Roosevelt's writings and speeches:
When Roosevelt asks Scrooge why he works so hard, despite already having made his fortune, Scrooge quotes back to him his words from their meeting in 1883 (in The Buckaroo of the Badlands); in fact, those words do not appear in the earlier comic, but are instead taken from Roosevelt's 1899 speech afterwards titled "The Strenuous Life":
I wish to preach, not the doctrine of ignoble ease, but the doctrine of the strenuous life, the life of toil and effort, of labor and strife; to preach that highest form of success which comes, not to the man who desires mere easy peace, but to the man who does not shrink from danger, from hardship, or from bitter toil, and who out of these wins the splendid ultimate triumph.
Likewise, when Scrooge delivers a brief homily on the beauty of the jungle wilderness, Roosevelt asks permission to use his words in a later book, and Scrooge agrees; the text in the comic is a passage from Roosevelt's foreword to his memoir African Game Trails, published in 1910:
There are no words that can tell the hidden spirit of the wilderness, that can reveal its mystery, its melancholy and its charm. There is a delight in the hardy life of the open... Apart from this, yet mingled with it, is the strong attraction of the silent places, of the large tropic moons, and the splendor of the new stars; where the wanderer sees the awful glory of sunrise and sunset in the wide waste spaces of the earth, unworn of man, and changed only by the slow change of the ages through time everlasting.

External links
 

Fiction set in 1906
2001 in comics
Donald Duck comics by Don Rosa
Comics set in the 1900s
Comics set in Panama
Comics set in the United States
Cultural depictions of Theodore Roosevelt
Disney comics stories
The Life and Times of Scrooge McDuck